Narjot (or Narjod) de Toucy (died 1293) was the son of Philip of Toucy and of Portia de Roye. Narjot was therefore the grandson of his namesake who died in 1241.

Narjot de Toucy was Lord of Laterza, Captain-General of the Kingdom of Albania, Admiral of the Angevin Kingdom of Sicily in 1277, and bailli of the Principality of Achaea in 1282. On 23 June 1287 he helped command an Angevin galley fleet which was defeated by a fleet commanded by Roger of Lauria in the Battle of the Counts.

In c. 1275 or 1278 he married Lucia I, titular princess of Antioch, who was to become Countess of Tripoli in 1288, later titular. They had one son, Philippe II de Toucy, who inherited the lordship of Laterza on Narjot's death in 1293 and the claim to Antioch on Lucia's death.

References

External links
 Medieval Lands Project

13th-century French nobility
1293 deaths
Year of birth unknown
Narjot
Baillis of the Principality of Achaea
Vicars-General of the Kingdom of Albania
Charles I of Anjou
Medieval admirals
13th-century people from the Principality of Achaea